Pelhřimov is a town in the Vysočina Region of the Czech Republic. It has about 16,000 inhabitants. The historic town centre is well preserved and is protected by law as an urban monument reservation.

Administrative parts
The following 26 villages are administrative parts of Pelhřimov:

Benátky
Bitětice
Čakovice
Chvojnov
Hodějovice
Houserovka
Janovice
Jelcovy Lhotky
Kocourovy Lhotky
Lešov
Lipice
Myslotín
Nemojov
Ostrovec
Pejškov
Pobistrýce
Radětín
Radňov
Rybníček
Skrýšov
Služátky
Starý Pelhřimov
Strměchy
Útěchovičky
Vlásenice
Vlásenice-Drbohlavy

Benátky, Houserovka, Janovice and Ostrovec, Lešov, Nemojov and Radňov, and Vlásenice-Drbohlavy form three exclaves of the municipal territory.

Geography

Pelhřimov lies in the Křemešník Highlands. It is located in the valley of the small river Bělá, which flows through the urban area. Typical for the area is a large number of small ponds.

History

According to a legend, Pelhřimov was founded by the bishop Pelhřim (Peregrinus) of Wartenberg in 1225–1226. The earliest settlement was probably founded in first half of the 13th century near the Church of Saint Vitus. The first written mention of Pelhřimov is from 1289, when it was raided by Vítek of Hluboká. In 1290, King Wenceslaus II granted Bishop Tobiáš of Bechyně a concession to renovate the town and fortify it. The town was first settled mainly by German colonists. Gradually Czechs established themselves as the majority.

In the Hussite Wars, Pelhřimov sided with the Hussites. The favourable position of the town, on the borderline of the domain of the Rosenberg family and of the lords of Kunštát, was important after the upheavals ended and the reconciliation of the lords began. In 1446-1450 Pelhřimov was chosen as the venue of land diets (parliaments or deliberative councils), attended in person even by King George of Poděbrady. Silver mining in the vicinity of Křemešník helped the expansion of Pelhřimov. The crafts flourished in the town. In 1434 the town was acquired by the Lords Trček of Lípa. They sold the estate in 1550 to Adam Říčanský of Říčany, who had built a castle adjacent to the town walls. The lords of Říčany resided in the castle until 1572, when the town bought its freedom.

In 1596, Emperor Rudolf II promoted Pelhřimov to a royal town. The repressions that followed the Bohemian Revolt interrupted the promising expansion of the town. The town was then severely damaged by a large fire in 1646, which destroyed most of the town's buildings. Another devastating fire ravaged the town in 1766. The burgher houses were uniformly reconstructed in the Renaissance-Baroque style and so the fires helped the town to maintain its homogeneity.

During the 19th century, the town has experienced cultural development as a result of the national revival. Patriotic associations, theatre and singing ensembles were founded. The salt house from 1707 was reconstructed as the National House and is today the Pelhřimov Theatre. In the second half of the 19th century, the industrialization occurred. it was represented especially by brush-making, hosiery and the production of agricultural implements.

Demographics

Economy
Pelhřimov is an industrial centre represented by the food industry, engineering and consumer goods manufacture.

Food processing — especially crops grown and produced in the district — is common. Škrobárny Pelhřimov is a potato starch factory that was founded in 1871. A production plant of MADETA a.s., the largest dairy company in the country, is located here since 1942. The branch is focused on box milk.

The largest employer based in the town is Agrostroj, an engineering company which manufactures farm machinery. It was founded in 1896 and employs more than 2,000 people. Other notable industrial companies include Spojené kartáčovny (SPOKAR), a major producer of brushes and toothbrushes, RIMOWA CZ, a manufacturer of luggages, and FIA ProTeam, a manufacturer of painting tools.

The largest non-industrial employer is the hospital.

Transport
Pelhřimov lies on the Jihlava – Tábor railroad. There are two railway stations, Pelhřimov and Vlásenice.

Pelhřimov lies at the intersection of two primary roads: I/19 Plzeň – Březnice – Tábor – Pelhřimov and I/34 České Budějovice – Jindřichův Hradec – Pelhřimov – Humpolec – Havlíčkův Brod – Svitavy.

Culture

Pelhřimov is nationwide known as "the town of records". Since 1991, the town hosts an annual international festival of records and curiosities.

The Dobrý den Agency is based in Pelhřimov. It is an organisation that maintains the Czech Database of Records and publishes Czech Book of Records, a national equivalent of Guinness World Records. It also operates the Museum of Records and Curiosities Pelhřimov and the Golden Czech Hands exposition.

Sport
There is a large sports complex with an ice stadium, athletic track, football pitch, tennis courts and swimming pools (including indoor).

Education
There are four primary schools, a special school, a grammar school (founded in 1871), a business academy, a hotel school, vocational secondary schools with a boarding houses, and other secondary schools.

Sights

The historic centre is formed by Masarykovo Square with adjacent streets. It was delimited by town walls, which remnants are preserved to this day.

Masarykovo Square
The town square is lined by well-preserved valuable Baroque and Renaissance houses with arcades and decorated gables, and contains also Art Nouveau buildings. The Šrejnar's House was built in the Renaissance style in 1614. It houses a tourist information centre and the Memorial Hall of the Lipský Family, whose members are one of the most famous natives. The Fára's House with Baroque façade and a mansard roof was rebuilt under a project by the architect Pavel Janák in the Cubist style in 1913–1914.

The Burgrave's House No. 17 was reconstructed after the fire in 1561. contains Renaissance, Neo-Classical and Empire elements. The façade is decorated with sgraffiti. In its premises there is a gallery and the Museum of Bugaboos.

In the middle of the square is a fountain with the statue of St. James the Great. The fountain was first mentioned in 1546 and the present-day appearance is from 1828.

Town fortification

The Renaissance castle from 1550 replaced an old manor house. Its oldest part is a Gothic bastion, incorporated into the castle after the fire in 1561. One of the three preserved town gates is also part of the castle. Significant reconstructions were made after the castle was damaged by fires in 1682 and 1766. Since then, the castle has undergone only minor decorative alterations. Since 1908, it houses the Vysočina Museum Pelhřimov. Its exhibitions focuses on regional history and ethnography, town jail and torture instruments, and work of local natives Josef Šejnosta (sculptor and medalist) and his son Zdeněk Šejnosta (sculptor and restorer).

The Lower (Jihlava) Gatehouse and the Upper (Rynárec) Gatehouse were built in the 16th century as parts of the fortification system. The Lower Gatehouse is a -high five-storeyed construction that today houses part of the Museum of Records and Curiosities.

Ecclesiastical buildings

The Gothic Church of Saint Bartholomew is one of the landmarks of the town. It was founded in the late 13th or the early 14th century. Since 1589 the church exterior shell has been defaced with sgraffiti. The main Baroque altar and depiction of Calvary, designed by František Bílek, is inside the church. It is open to the public.

The Church of Saint Vitus is documented in 1325 and is the oldest sacral building in Pelhřimov. The former parish church was originally built in the Gothic style, which is still evident in the presbytery. After many reconstructions, it contains Gothic, Renaissance and mainly Baroque elements. Nowadays the church is used as an exhibition and concert hall.

The Chapel of the Holy Cross was originally built in 1671 as a small replica of the Church of the Holy Sepulchre in Jerusalem. It was extended to a church in 1750 and a tower was added. In 1865 the town council decided to demolish the structure and build a new church. The new chapel was built in the Neo-Gothic style in 1883–1886.

The originally pilgrimage Chapel of Our Lady of Sorrows was built in the Baroque style in 1710–1714, after several seemingly miraculous healings happenned here. The crypt of the chapel used to be a burial place for members of burgher families. The town cemetery was transferred here from the Church of St. Vitus in 1787 and until 1906, it served as a cemetery chapel.

Notable people

Vojtěch Benedikt Juhn (1779–1843), painter
Václav Fresl (1868–1915), politician
Otomar Krejča (1921–2003), theatre director and dissident
Lubomír Lipský (1923–2015), actor
Oldřich Lipský (1924–1986), film director and screenwriter
Joseph Veverka (born 1941), American astronomer
František Vyskočil (born 1941), neurophysiologist
Jan Kůrka (born 1943), sports shooter, Olympic winner
Jiří Novotný (born 1983), ice hockey player
Tomáš Sivok (born 1983), footballer
Milan Kopic (born 1985), footballer
Martin Frk (born 1993), ice hockey player
Libor Šulák (born 1994), ice hockey player

Twin towns – sister cities

Pelhřimov is twinned with:
 Dolný Kubín, Slovakia
 Mukachevo, Ukraine
 St. Valentin, Austria

Gallery

References

External links

Official tourist portal

Cities and towns in the Czech Republic
Populated places in Pelhřimov District